Sumet Jumsai na Ayudhya (born 1939 in Bangkok, Thailand) is a Thai architect. He was named a National Artist of Thailand in 1998; Honorary Fellow of The American Institute of Architects 2001 ; Member of the French Académie d'Architecture 2002 ; Fellow Commoner, St.John's College, Cambridge, 2003 and 2013, where he earlier obtained a doctorate degree in architecture ; and Chevalier de l'Ordre des Arts et des Lettres (France) 2008. He is also a painter and author.

Works

References

Further reading
Brian Brace Taylor & John Hoskin. Sumet Jumsai. Asia Books (1996). .
Biography from the Thai Ministry of Culture (more extensive version in Thai)
Contemporary Architects, edited by Muriel Emanuel, Macmillan, London, and St. James Press, Chicago 1980 ; 2nd ed. 1987 ; 3rd ed. 1995.
Sir Banister Fletcher’s A History of Architecture, Architectural Press, London 1996.
The dictionary of Art, ed. Jane Turner, Macmillan, London 1996 ; Grove Dictionaries, New York 1996 ; in 34 vols ; Vol. 17, pp. 686–7.
World Architecture 1900-2000 : A Critical Mosaic, Volume 10 : Southeast Asia and the Oceania, Kenneth Frampton and others, China Architecture & Building Press, Beijing 2000 / Springer Wien, New York 2000.
()

Sumet Jumsai
Alumni of St John's College, Cambridge
Living people
1939 births
Members of the Académie d'architecture
Sumet Jumsai